The 25th Lambda Literary Awards were held on June 3, 2013, to honor works of LGBT literature published in 2012.

Yolanda Wallace became the first African-American writer to win the Lesbian Romance category with her win for Month of Sundays. Tom Léger and Riley MacLeod, co-editors of the anthology The Collection: Short Fiction from the Transgender Vanguard, were the first transgender authors to win the Transgender Fiction award. 2013 was also the first year in the history of the awards that the Transgender Fiction award was both presented by and accepted by trans authors.

Special awards

Nominees and winners

References

External links
 25th Lambda Literary Awards

Lambda Literary Awards
Lambda
Lists of LGBT-related award winners and nominees
2013 in LGBT history
Lambda